Pādodaka (Sanskrit: पादोदक, lit. foot-water) is holy water. Its prepared from bathing the Linga or guru's feet. It is one of the Ashtavarana or the 'eight protections' of Lingayatism.

This holy water is used in many sacred occasions to call upon good fortune and celestial blessing. It is sprinkled across while entering into a new house, on the newly bought vehicle etc.

See also 

 Añjali Mudrā
 Buddhist prayer beads
 Culture of India
 Guru-shishya tradition
 Hindu prayer beads
 Indian honorifics
 Mala
 Mudras
 Namaste
 Pranāma
 Puja (Hinduism)

References

Hindu studies
Lingayatism